The 97th Bombardment Wing is an inactive United States Army Air Forces unit. Its last assignment was with 9th Bombardment Division, at Camp Shanks, New York, where it was inactivated on 11 October 1945.

History
The wing was activated in late November 1943 at Marks Hall, England.  It was assigned three Douglas A-20 Havoc groups in the spring of 1944 and conducted combat missions from April 1944 until VE Day.  In late 1944 and early 1945, its groups converted to the more capable Douglas A-26 Invader.  In October 1945 the wing returned to the United States and was inactivated.

Lineage
 Constituted as the 97th Combat Bombardment Wing (Medium) on 2 November 1943
 Activated on 12 November 1943
 Redesignated 97th Combat Bombardment Wing, Light in July 1944
 Redesignated 97th Bombardment Wing, Medium in June 1945
 Inactivated on 11 October 1945

Assignments
 9th Bombardment Division, 12 November 1943 – 11 October 1945

Stations
 Marks Hall, England (Station 160), 12 November 1943
 RAF Little Walden (AAF-165), England, 13 March 1944
 Voisenon, France, 13 September 1944
 Marchais, Aisne, France, 13 February 1945
 Arrancy, France, 25 April 1945
 Sandaucourt, France, 24 May – 1 October 1945
 Camp Shanks, New York, 10–11 October 1945

Components
 409th Bombardment Group: 7 March 1944 – 15 August 1945
 410th Bombardment Group: 4 April 1944 – June 1945
 416th Bombardment Group: 4 February 1944 – 27 July 1945 4 (under the operational control of 99th Combat Bombardment Wing, until c. 20 March 1944, IX Bomber Command, 11 – 18 September 1944 and 99th Combat Bombardment Wing, 19 – 28 September 1944)

References

Notes

Bibliography

 
 
 

Military units and formations established in 1943
097